Baltis Rose (January 5, 1817 – February 14, 1897) was a farmer and political figure in Ontario. He represented Hastings West in the Legislative Assembly of Ontario from 1882 to 1883 as a Conservative member.

He was born in Sidney Township, the son of Jacob Rose and Gabella Fulton. After completing his schooling, Rose worked on a number of farms in the region. He then leased farmland for eight years and saved enough money to be able to purchase his own farm. He married Harriet Irvine. Rose was reeve for Sidney Township and also served as warden for Hastings County. He was elected to the assembly in an 1882 by-election held after Alexander Robertson resigned his seat to run for a seat in the House of Commons. He died in Sidney Township in 1897.

References

External links

1817 births
1897 deaths
Progressive Conservative Party of Ontario MPPs